Cen Zeliu (1912–1941), also Shum Tsak-lau (Cantonese): was born in Enping, Guangdong, China. He trained in the Guangdong provincial aviation academy as a fighter pilot, graduating in 1934, and attached to the provincial warlord air force of General Chen Jitang. With the imminence of war between China and the Empire of Japan brewing ever since the Manchurian Incident of 1931, Cen Zeliu and his compatriots were indignant on taking the fight back to the Imperial Japanese invasion and occupation.

In May 1936, General Chen Jitang conspired to join the warlord regiment of the New Guangxi Clique in an affront against the hope of joining with the central government of China under Generalissimo Chiang Kai-shek for a unified national front against the ambitions and aggressions of the Imperial Japanese invasion; this set the stage for Cen Zeliu and members of the Guangdong Air Force under General Huang Guangrui, the air force's Commander-in-Chief, to embark on the "Northern Flight" (北飛) defection to the centralized Nationalist Air Force of China in midst of the Guangzhou-Guangxi Incident in June–July 1936.

Career

With the outbreak of the War of Resistance and World War II in Asia following the 7/7 Incident,  then-Lieutenant Cen Zeliu along with his ex-Guangdong warlord air force squadron mates were all assigned to their station at Jurong Airbase as the 8th Pursuit Squadron of the 3rd Pursuit Group of the Nationalist Air Force of China equipped with the Fiat CR.32 fighter planes; they would engage the Imperial Japanese in aerial combat for the first time on 15 August 1937 when Imperial Japanese Navy G3M bombers of the Kisarazu Kokutai raided Jurong, and Lt. Cen Zeliu and Lt. Huang Chuku would each share a G3M kill each with their 8th PS squadron mates in this battle. A total of fourteen G3Ms were shot down by various pilots of the 3rd, 4th and 5th groups (flying Hawk IIs/Hawk IIIs and P-26 Model 281s) in this engagement over the Nanjing area, and this was a severe blow to the Japanese Naval Air command whom were strongly influenced with the idea that they could simply neutralize the Chinese Air Force and the Nationalist government with the blitz of their schnellbomber (fast bomber) attack, based on the aerial warfare theories of Giulio Douhet as exemplified a few months prior in the Bombing of Guernica in Spain, but unbeknownst to the Japanese, the Chinese Air Force had the advantage of an effective early air raid-warning net, and fighter aircraft that were almost as fast as the modern and sleek G3Ms (G3M max-speed of 232 mph vs CR.32 max-speed of 220 mph, or 225 mph and 234 mph of the Hawk IIIs and P-26/281s respectively in primary use by the CAF), but can still engage the fleeing G3M bombers with the proper vectoring and diving maneuvers.

Lt. Cen Zeliu attacked the cruiser Izumo on 8 September 1937, although his bombs didn't not hit the ship. He was then transferred to Gongxingdun Aerodrome in Lanzhou to train in, and help other Chinese Air Force fighter pilots with conversion into Soviet-made Polikarpov I-15 and I-16 fighters supplied under the new Sino-Soviet Treaty of 1937. His next battles would take place with the close-air support at Fenglingdu, Shanxi province on 8 March 1938, and participated in an air-battle over the city of Xi'an on 11 March 1938 as the new commander of the 17th Pursuit Squadron. Lt. Cen would then be dispatched to the defense of the provisional wartime capital of Wuhan, at the Xiaogan Airbase, where he fought alongside the Soviet Volunteer Group aviators  in the massive 100-plane air-battle against the IJN A5M fighters and G3M bombers over Wuhan on the 29 April 1938; shooting down 21 of the enemy aircraft.

References

Bibliography

 Cheung, Raymond. Osprey Aircraft of the Aces 126: Aces of the Republic of China Air Force. Oxford: Bloomsbury Publishing Plc, 2015. .
 徐 (Xú), 露梅 (Lùméi). 隕落 (Fallen): 682位空军英烈的生死档案 - 抗战空军英烈档案大解密 (A Decryption of 682 Air Force Heroes of The War of Resistance-WWII and Their Martyrdom). 东城区, 北京， 中国: 团结出版社, 2016. .

Republic of China Air Force personnel
Chinese aviators
Chinese World War II flying aces
Aviators killed by being shot down
1912 births
1941 deaths
Chinese military personnel killed in World War II